General elections were held in Japan on 20 February 1928, the first after the introduction of universal male suffrage. The ruling Rikken Seiyūkai led by Prime Minister Tanaka Giichi won one more seat than the opposition Rikken Minseitō led by Hamaguchi Osachi, although Rikken Minseitō had received slightly more votes. The hung parliament led to the Tanaka government continuing in office.

Electoral system
Following electoral reforms in 1925, the 466 members of the House of Representatives were elected from multi-member constituencies with between three and five seats. Voting had previously been restricted to men aged over 25 who paid at least 3 yen a year in direct taxation, but the reforms had also abolished the taxation requirement. As a result, the electorate increased from 3.3 million in the 1924 elections to 12.4 million.

Results

By prefecture

Aftermath
The Manchurian warlord Zhang Zuolin was assassinated by the Japanese army in June 1928. Tanaka denounced the army for this, but lost support and was forced to resign in July 1929. Opposition leader Hamaguchi became Prime Minister and formed a new government.

References

General elections in Japan
Japan
1928 elections in Japan
February 1928 events
Election and referendum articles with incomplete results